Flecker is a German language occupational or topographic surname and may refer to:
Bruno Flecker (born 1953), Austrian rower
Florian Flecker (born 1995), Austrian footballer
Hugo Flecker (1884–1957), Australian medical practitioner
James Elroy Flecker (1884–1915), British novelist and playwright

See also 
 Fleck
 Flicker (disambiguation)

References 

German-language surnames
Yiddish-language surnames